Mount Somolenko is a volcanic peak in southwestern British Columbia, Canada, located  east of Rivers Inlet and  south of Mount Silverthrone. It is the highest peak south of Mount Silverthrone in the Ha-Iltzuk Icefield.

Mount Somolenko lies in a circular volcanic depression in the Pacific Ranges of the Coast Mountains called the Silverthrone Caldera.

See also
 List of volcanoes in Canada
 Volcanology of Canada
 Volcanology of Western Canada

References

Two-thousanders of British Columbia
Volcanoes of British Columbia
Pacific Ranges
Range 2 Coast Land District